Joan Haanappel (born 13 November 1940) is a Dutch former figure skater and sports presenter for NOS, AVRO, ZDF and Eurosport. She is a three-time European bronze medalist (1958–1960) and a four-time Dutch national champion.

Career

Skating career 
Haanappel began skating in 1949 at Houtrust ice skating club in The Hague. Aged 12 years, she competed at her first major international competition, the European Championships in Dortmund, where she finished 14th. She won the first of her four Dutch national titles in 1955. She finished 13th at the 1956 Winter Olympics in Cortina d'Ampezzo, Italy.

In 1958, Haanappel became the first Dutch figure skater to win a continental medal, finishing third behind Austria duo Ingrid Wendl and Hanna Walter at the 1958 European Championships in Bratislava, Czechoslovakia. The following season, she was surpassed by Sjoukje Dijkstra at the Dutch Championships. She took bronze at the 1959 European Championships in Davos, Switzerland, joining Walter and Dijkstra on the podium.

1959–1960 was Haanappel's final competitive season. She won gold at the Richmond Trophy and finished second again to Dijkstra at the Dutch Championships. She won her third consecutive bronze medal at the 1960 European Championships in Garmisch-Partenkirchen, West Germany, and then placed 5th at the 1960 Winter Olympics in Squaw Valley, Placer County, California.

After the 1960 World Championships, Haanappel retired from amateur competition and turned professional, performing with the Vienna Ice Revue before joining Holiday on Ice.

Later career 

In 1976, Haanappel began a 30-year television career as a presenter and sports commentator. She has worked for Studio Sport, Eurosport, the sports division at ZDF (Germany), and as a freelancer.

In 2005, Haanappel was appointed to the figure skating committee of the Royal Netherlands Skating Federation (KNSB). In 2006, she became the first figure skater to be elected a member of the KNSB Council. She left the KNSB Council in 2008.

Haanappel founded Stichting Kunstrijden Nederland, SKN, (Netherlands Figure Skating Foundation) [www.sknfonds.nl], a non-profit organisation supporting talented young Dutch figure skaters. On 12 November 2008 she was appointed Knight in the Royal Order of Oranje-Nassau.

Results

External links
Haanappel's comments on the 1994 Europeans

Dutch female single skaters
1940 births
Living people
Olympic figure skaters of the Netherlands
Figure skaters at the 1956 Winter Olympics
Figure skaters at the 1960 Winter Olympics
Dutch sports announcers
Sportspeople from The Hague
European Figure Skating Championships medalists